The Georgia men's national water polo team represents Georgia in international men's water polo competitions. The team participated at the 2014 European Championship.

Results

World Championships

World League
 – Host of the Super Final

European Championships

Europa Cup

Team

Current squad
Roster for the 2020 Men's European Water Polo Championship.

Head coach: Revaz Chomakhidze

Notable players
 Givi Chikvanaia
 Mikhail Giorgadze
 Leri Gogoladze
 Nodar Gvakhariya
 Georgi Mshvenieradze
 Petre Mshvenieradze
 Revaz Tchomakhidze

Naturalized players
Damir Crepulja (now Tsrepulia) (MNE), Marko Elez (CRO), Marino Franičević (CRO), Marko Jelača (CRO), Ivan Strujić (CRO), Fabio Baraldi (ITA), Boris Vapenski (SRB)

Player statistics

Most appearances

Top scorers

Statistics

 *includes European B (or Level II) Championship
 **other official (usually announced in LEN calendar) senior tournaments (usually friendly fixtures) – list: Tbilisi Cup (2010, 2012, 2013, 2015), Nodar Gvakharia Cup (2015), Danube Cup (52nd/2014), Tatarstan Cup – Kazan (2015), Aleksei Barkalov Memorial – Kiev (2010), Ibrahim Sulu Memorial (2015)

References

Water polo
Men's national water polo teams
National water polo teams in Europe
National water polo teams by country
 
Men's sport in Georgia (country)